Pra Quem Fica, Tchau ( "For those who stay, bye bye") is a 1971 Brazilian comedy film directed by and starring Reginaldo Faria. The film was selected as the Brazilian entry for the Best Foreign Language Film at the 44th Academy Awards, but was not accepted as a nominee.

Cast
 Reginaldo Faria as Didi
 Stepan Nercessian as Lui
 Rosana Tapajós as Maria
 Flávio Migliaccio as Chuca
 José Lewgoy as Tio Gustavo
 Jorge Cherques as Marido de Maria
 Irma Álvarez as Mulher do jeep
 Tânia Scher as Mulher do conversível
 Hugo Bidet as Teleco
 Gracinda Freire as Tia Lourdes
 Wilza Carla as Dalva
 Henriqueta Brieba as Mãe de Maria

See also
 List of submissions to the 44th Academy Awards for Best Foreign Language Film
 List of Brazilian submissions for the Academy Award for Best Foreign Language Film

References

External links
 

1971 films
1971 comedy films
Brazilian comedy films
1970s Portuguese-language films
Films directed by Reginaldo Faria